Mykola Kindratovych Kondratyuk (May 5, 1931 in Starokostiantyniv – November 16, 2006 in Kyiv) was a Soviet and Ukrainian Chamber concert and opera singer (baritone), educator, social activist. People's Artist of the USSR (1978).

Member of the CPSU since 1961. Deputy of the Supreme Soviet of the Ukrainian SSR of the 9th and 10th convocations.

References

External links
 Николай Кондратюк. Биография
 Песни на украинском языке
 

1931 births
2006 deaths
20th-century Ukrainian male opera singers
20th-century Ukrainian politicians
People from Starokostiantyniv
Communist Party of the Soviet Union members
Kyiv Conservatory alumni
Academic staff of Kyiv Conservatory
Kyiv Conservatory rectors
Ninth convocation members of the Verkhovna Rada of the Ukrainian Soviet Socialist Republic
Tenth convocation members of the Verkhovna Rada of the Ukrainian Soviet Socialist Republic
Recipients of the title of People's Artists of Ukraine
People's Artists of the USSR
Recipients of the Order of Merit (Ukraine), 3rd class
Recipients of the Order of the Red Banner of Labour
Recipients of the Shevchenko National Prize
Soviet male opera singers
Soviet music educators
Ukrainian baritones

Ukrainian folk singers
Ukrainian male opera singers
Ukrainian music educators
Burials at Baikove Cemetery